Veikko Kansikas (24 November 1923, in Kuusankoski – 6 September 1991) was a Finnish plumber and politician. He was a member of the Parliament of Finland from 1959 to 1962, representing the Finnish People's Democratic League (SKDL). Kansikas was the secretary of the Kouvola area organisation of the Communist Party of Finland (SKP).

References

1923 births
1991 deaths
People from Kuusankoski
Communist Party of Finland politicians
Finnish People's Democratic League politicians
Members of the Parliament of Finland (1958–62)